Jacques Philip (born 22 March 1963) is a French former professional footballer who played as a defender. He notably played for Lyon in the Division 2 and for Laval and Caen in the Division 1.

References 

1963 births
Living people
Sportspeople from Brest, France
Footballers from Brittany
French footballers
Association football defenders
INF Vichy players
Olympique Lyonnais players
Stade Lavallois players
Stade Malherbe Caen players
US Avranches players
Quimper Kerfeunteun F.C. players
French Division 3 (1971–1993) players
Ligue 2 players
Ligue 1 players
Championnat National players